Sir Nicholas Serota Makes an Acquisitions Decision is one of the paintings that was made as a part of the Stuckism art movement, and is recognized as a "signature piece" for the movement, It was painted by the Stuckism co-founder Charles Thomson in 2000, and has been exhibited in a number of shows since, as well as being featured on placards during Stuckist demonstrations against the Turner Prize.

It depicts Sir Nicholas Serota, Director of the Tate Gallery, and chairman of the Turner Prize jury. "Emin" satirises Young British Artist Tracey Emin's installation My Bed, consisting of her bed and objects, including knickers, which she exhibited in 1999 as a Turner Prize nominee.

Background and Description
In 1999, Thomson was the co-founder, with Billy Childish of the Stuckism art group, which set out to promote figurative painting, in opposition to conceptual art, which they identified with the Turner Prize (whose jury chairman was Sir Nicholas Serota) and the Young British Artists, of which Tracey Emin (who had once been in a relationship with Childish) was a leading representative.

Thomson's painting shows Serota, the director of the Tate gallery. He is smiling behind a large pair of red knickers on a washing line, saying "is it a genuine Emin (£10,000)" and thinking, "or a worthless fake?". This is a reference to Tracey Emin's My Bed, literally a display of her (dishevelled) bed with detritus which included a pair of her knickers, shown in the 1999 Turner Prize at Tate Britain.  The image was painted over a few days and in a final 24-hour non-stop stint.

Shows

The painting was first exhibited in March 2000 at Joe Crompton's Gallery 108, Leonard Street, Shoreditch, London as the highlight of the third Stuckist show, The Resignation of Sir Nicholas Serota, which included a display of paintings about Serota. A small black-and-white image appeared in the Daily Telegraph. It was displayed again in the Stuckists Real Turner Prize Show later in the year. Richard Dean wrote:

The painting was included in the show catalogue, a signed copy of which was left at the Tate for Serota by Thomson and Billy Childish, the co-founder of the Stuckists. Artist Ranko Bon described greeting Serota at the opening of that year's Turner Prize at Tate Britain:
"Ah," I grabbed him by his bony shoulders, "when I look at you like this, I cannot but see Charles Thomson's portrait of you, which I saw last night at The Real Turner Prize Show in Shoreditch." I emphasized the word "real" with all my might. "Yes," Nick beamed back at me without even blinking, "I must see it!"

It was exhibited in summer 2002 during The First Stuckist International, the inaugural show at Thomson's Stuckism International Gallery (which closed in 2005). Sarah Kent (a staunch advocate of Britart) said: "One might forgive his puerile humour if Thomson didn't consider it a serious weapon ... cut the ranting and Thomson could be a reasonable painter." Thomson pointed out in response, "it's reality. A few weeks after I did the painting, Tracey Emin was shown on TV getting very angry about an installation because someone had substituted another pair of knickers for hers ... That makes it a bit sad."

The painting was also shown at the 2004 Liverpool Biennial in The Stuckists Punk Victorian show at the Walker Art Gallery. Serota went to the show and commented that it was "lively", while standing next to Thomson's painting of him.  John Russell Taylor started his review of the Biennial in The Times, "Say what you will about the Stuckists, they certainly know what they don’t like. In the eccentric British group’s latest show the most explicit target is clearly the Turner Prize: the attitude can be summed up in one painting, Charles Thomson’s Sir Nicholas Serota Makes an Acquisitions Decision". 160 paintings from the show were offered as a donation to the Tate, including Thomson's painting of Serota, but "not surprisingly" rejected by Serota, who said, "We do not feel that the work is of sufficient quality in terms of accomplishment, innovation or originality of thought to warrant preservation in perpetuity in the national collection."

The painting was the centrepiece at Spectrum London gallery in September 2006 in the Go West exhibition and priced at £30,000. The show at Spectrum London was the Stuckists' first show in a commercial gallery in the West End of London. The Spectrum London director, Royden Prior, said people shouldn't just look at the politics, but should look beyond them because "These artists are good, and are part of art history,"  Jane Morris wrote in The Guardian, "If the stuckists go down in art history, and the jury is still out as to whether they will, Sir Nicholas Serota Makes an Acquisitions Decision by stuckist co-founder Charles Thomson may well become their signature piece." The Evening Standard said some people would see the display of the painting as revenge against Serota, after he had rejected the Stuckists' offer to donate work to the Tate; it also mentioned that the Stuckists had first drawn attention to the Tate's purchase of The Upper Room by Chris Ofili, a Tate trustee, which had led to the Tate being censured by the Charity Commission in 2006.

General election
In 2001 Thomson stood in the General Election as the Stuckist Candidate. His opponent was Chris Smith, the then Culture Minister. Thomson adopted the painting of Sir Nicholas Serota and the knickers as the official logo of his party. He said "I can't see how the Electoral Commission would find it offensive. The real thing is on display at Tate Modern. What's more her knickers were funded by Chris Smith using public money."

Demonstrations

The painting was used on one of the placards, when the Stuckists staged a protest at the unveiling of Rachel Whiteread's sculpture, Untitled Monument, in Trafalgar Square on 4 June 2001. Serota remonstrated with Thomson and told him the demonstration was a "cheap shot".

The image has also been used on posters in Stuckist demonstrations which were held outside the Turner Prize at Tate Britain 2000–2006. Photographs such as the one shown are used on the Stuckist web site to promote and record the demonstration.

In December 2006, during the Stuckists' demonstration, Thomson handed Serota a leaflet with the painting on it. This incident was caught by a freelance photographer, Rick Friend, on video, which was put on the Stuckism web site, along with the still image from it shown here. Serota stood on the steps of the Tate and held up the postcard, saying, "Can't you make another image?"

Influence

Thomson has said that his painting was the idea that Stella Vine used for her painting of Princess Diana, Hi Paul Can You Come Over, that launched her to fame when it was bought by Charles Saatchi in 2004. Three years before, she had been a member of the Stuckist group and also briefly married to Thomson, who said that she was aware of the media appeal of the idea, as he had shown her press cuttings of the painting.

He said that she had not previously done a painting in that way and that "Her painting of Princess Diana was based on the same idea as my painting Sir Nicholas Serota Makes an Acquisitions Decision — namely to imagine what a famous person is thinking and write the words next to a portrait of them. She has made an intelligent, innovative and personal interpretation of influences to form her own identity, which is what all artists do. It is only fair and honest to acknowledge there was this help and there has been an influence." Vine refutes the idea that Thomson and the Stuckists had any role to play in her development, citing her inspiration instead as Sophie von Hellermann, Elizabeth Peyton, Anna Bjerger, Karen Kilimnik and Paul Housley 

Thomson also drew a comparison between his and Vine's painting and a later work, Break Art Free, by Gina Bold: "You can't deny there's a connection between those works, but they are all also works with a strong individual identity. You certainly wouldn't say it’s plagiarism, but they spring from the same underlying idea." Mark D in turn made a satirical version of Vine's painting, substituting Victoria Beckham for Princess Diana.

Gallery

References and notes

External links
Video of Sir Nicholas Serota given a postcard of the painting

English contemporary works of art
Stuckism
British paintings
2000 works
2000 in art
2000 paintings